Raon Digital was a Korean company that manufactured Ultra-Mobile PCs (UMPCs) such as the Raon Vega, Raon Everun and Everun Note. The company closed in 2009.

References

External links
 Reviews of Raon Vega: 1 2 3
 Review of Everun Note: 1

Electronics companies of South Korea